Bror Bügler (11 December 1908 – 3 October 1975) was a Swedish film actor. He also directed three films.

Selected filmography
 Oh, Such a Night! (1937)
 Art for Art's Sake (1938)
 A Woman's Face (1938)
 Just a Bugler (1938)
 Good Friends and Faithful Neighbours (1938)
 Circus (1939)
 Nothing But the Truth (1939)
 With Open Arms (1940)
 Första divisionen (1941)
 Scanian Guerilla (1941)
 The Ghost Reporter (1941)
 Sun Over Klara (1942)
 Adventurer (1942)
 A Girl for Me (1943)
 Life in the Country (1943)
 Each Heart Has Its Own Story (1948)
 The Girl from Backafall (1953)

References

Bibliography 
 Chandler, Charlotte. Ingrid: Ingrid Bergman, A Personal Biography. Simon and Schuster, 2007.

External links 
 

1908 births
1975 deaths
People from Vänersborg Municipality
Swedish film directors
Swedish male film actors
20th-century Swedish male actors